PAB-dependent poly(A)-specific ribonuclease subunit 2 is an enzyme that in humans is encoded by the PAN2 gene.

References

Further reading